Neocollyris subtileflavescens is a species of ground beetle in the genus Neocollyris in the family Carabidae. It was described by Horn in 1913.

References

Subtileflavescens, Neocollyris
Beetles described in 1913